John Gilbert (14 March 1812 – 28 June 1845) was an English naturalist and explorer. Gilbert is often cited in the earliest descriptions of many Australian animals, many of which were unrecorded in European literature, and some of these are named for him by those authors. Gilbert was sent to the newly founded Swan River Colony and made collections and notes on the unique birds and mammals of the surrounding region. He later joined expeditions to remote parts the country, continuing to make records and collections until he was killed during a violent altercation at Mitchell River (Queensland) on the Cape York Peninsula.

Early life
John Gilbert was born on 14 March 1812 in Newington Butts, south London, England and was christened on 25 October 1812 at Spa Fields Lady Huntingdons, Clerkenwell, London. His father was William and his mother Ann, who were from nearby villages in Kent.

Gilbert was a taxidermist for the Zoological Society of London, where he met John Gould. Gould had recruited Gilbert, four years his junior, to work there. But 18 months later, Gilbert was sacked for being absent without leave.

Australian expeditions
Gilbert travelled to Australia in 1838 with the Goulds and their young nephew Henry William Coxen.  Gilbert was paid 100 pounds per annum plus expenses, but he was expected to account meticulously for every penny and to keep his expenses as small as possible. Gould and Gilbert reached Hobart on the Parsee on 19 September 1838. Both worked in Tasmania for a few months.

The party landed in Hobart, Tasmania in September, and in January, Gilbert and Gould traveled overland together to Launceston. Gould decided they should separate, and sent Gilbert off on 4 February 1839 to the Swan River Colony, assuring him that he would look after all his personal possessions which were still in Hobart. Gilbert was instructed to collect as many specimens as possible, then meet up again in Sydney, where Gould would wait for him until the end of April the following year. He worked mostly in the vicinity of Perth, gathering specimens for Gould for 11 months.

Gilbert disembarked from the ship Comet on 6 March 1839 at Fremantle, Western Australia, the port of the colony in its first decade. He  met Francis Armstrong within a few days, who was acquainted with the Nyungar peoples of the region, and began to make collections in the area around the Swan River and York. His arrival began a period of ornithological research that saw large number of his specimens described and depicted by the Goulds, many of which were "discovered", the field notes that accompanied these gave details of birds of the west that allowed inclusion in their ambitious publication.

Meanwhile, Gould returned to Hobart, where his wife Elizabeth awaited him. They lived in style with their servants in Government House. Taking one servant with him, Gould visited New South Wales and was made welcome by his wife's family, the Coxens and other wealthy landlords. He returned to Hobart just in time for the birth of his seventh child (a son they named Franklin Tasman). Almost immediately, Gould set off again, this time for South Australia, where he met the Governor and accompanied Charles Sturt on his expedition to the Murray Scrubs. When he returned to Hobart, the Goulds travelled together to New South Wales, where Elizabeth's brothers lived. Gould collected many birds and mammals, some of which were new to science. The Goulds left for England on 9 April.

When Gilbert arrived in Sydney on 30 April, he found his employer gone. To rub salt in his wound, his trunk had been ransacked and many of the possessions that Gould had promised to protect, had been stolen. Gilbert had provided Gould with thousands of specimens of every description, from quadrupeds to insects, from shells to crustacea, from plants to reptiles, but mainly and most importantly, birds and eggs. He had provided Gould with over 60 new species of birds, including the extinct paradise parrot which he first discovered in the Darling Downs in June 1844.

Gilbert travelled by boat to Port Essington, north of where Darwin is today. There, he collected, among many other things, a beautiful, newly discovered finch and returned with it to Gould in England. there he found his employer mourning his wife, Elizabeth, who had died after the birth of their eighth child. She was just 37. Gould named the finch after his wife, so Elizabeth is remembered today in this gorgeous little bird, called not Elizabeth's finch, but more cryptically, the Gouldian finch. As Elizabeth was the illustrator of all the works, not her husband, Gould then needed to recruit other artists to finish the work that Elizabeth had tirelessly begun.

Gilbert soon returned to Australia to collect again for Gould. He discovered the paradise parrot and thought it 'without exception the most beautiful of the whole tribe I have ever yet seen in Australia.' He begged Gould to name it after him, saying, 'I know of no species that would delight me more to see gilbertii attached to than this beautiful bird.' Gould declined, saying he did not like naming species after people, and anyway, he had just recently named another species after him. Apparently, Gould saw no contradiction in this explanation and though the paradise parrot is now extinct, Gilbert is remembered in the Gilbert's whistler.

Naming the Gilbert's whistler was one of Gould's rare ornithological mistakes. He had already named the eastern race of the same bird, calling it the 'unadorned thickhead', perhaps giving some indication of what he thought of the bird. By convention, the first name stands, so today the scientific name is Pachycephalia inornata. But while technically speaking, the name Gilbert's whistler refers just to the western race of the bird, the name is used universally today for the species. Gould also honoured Gilbert when naming two animals that Gilbert had collected for him from the dense heath in the south-west of Western Australia, Gilbert's dunnart and Gilbert's potoroo.

Gilbert collected specimens of 432 birds, including 36 new species from Western Australia, and 318 mammals, including 22 species not previously known in the west. By the end of January 1844, he was back in Sydney, and during the next six months worked his way to the Darling Downs in Queensland. The Coxen family who settled the Darling Downs region were related by marriage; Gould's wife Elizabeth (née Coxen) was sister to Charles and Stephen, and aunt to Henry William Coxen. The families allowed Gould and Gilbert to stay on their properties to collect fauna and flora of the district.

Leichhardt's expedition

While Gilbert was considering which part of the continent should next be investigated, Ludwig Leichhardt arrived with the other members of his expedition to Port Essington (east of Darwin, and since abandoned), and Gilbert was allowed to join the party in September 1844.  In November, they decided the party was too large for the amount of provisions they had with them, and Leichhardt ruled that the two who had joined last should return.  Eventually, however, it was decided that Hodgson and Caleb should return, and Gilbert remained to become later on practically the second in command of the expedition.  One member of the party, a boy of 16, was too young to be of much use and the leader's treatment of the two Aboriginal members of the party was lacking in tact and consideration.  A good deal of responsibility therefore fell upon Gilbert, who was the best bushman of a very mixed company.  The progress made for several months was much less than was anticipated and, by May 1845, supplies of food were running very short.

Death

On 28 June 1845 at the Mitchell River near Dunbar, Queensland on the Cape York Peninsula near the Gulf of Carpentaria, Gilbert was killed by a flying spear when natives made a night attack on the expedition's camp, because some of their women had been molested by the two Aboriginal members of the Leichhardt party. There still exists some controversy over his death – the wound was apparently smaller than a spear, and some suggest he died from accidental shooting by one of his companions. He was buried on the spot, a tree nearby was marked, and a fire was lit over the disturbed earth to screen the grave; this, although much searched for, has not since been found.

Aftermath
Other members of the expedition received several spear thrusts but recovered. Leichhardt then turned south-westerly, skirting the gulf for a while, and reached Port Essington almost exhausted in December 1845. Leichhardt preserved Gilbert's papers and his diary, which, however, was lost for nearly 100 years before its discovery by A. H. Chisholm.  Almost everything known about Gilbert is owed to Chisholm's research, which shows Gilbert as a man of much ability and fine character who had a great respect for the Aboriginal peoples.

Legacy
There is a memorial to John Gilbert in St James' Church, Sydney. John Gilbert's memorial at St James' church is inscribed with the Latin phrase Dulce et decorum est pro scientia mori, which may be translated as "it is sweet and fitting to die for science."

There is also a memorial to Gilbert at Gilbert's Lookout at Taroom.

Various geographic features have been named after him, including:
 Gilbert River, flowing into the Gulf of Carpentaria
 Gilberton, on the Gilbert River headwaters 
 Gilbert River Telegraph Station, between Croydon and Georgetown
 Gilbert Range, near the Dawson Valley
 Gilbert's Dome, in the Peak Range in Central Queensland

Gilbert's potoroo (Potorous gilbertii ), a species of mammal, was named after him; as was Gilbert's dragon (Lophognathus gilberti ), a species of lizard.

On 28 June 1945, to mark the centenary of Gilbert's death, wreaths of Australian wildflowers were placed on the marble memorial tablet in St James' Church in Sydney by representatives of:
 the Royal Australian Historical Society of Sydney
 the Royal Ornithologists' Union of Sydney
 the Field Naturalists' Club of Victoria
 the Melbourne Bird Observers' Club

In the 1980s, the Australian Army searched for Gilbert's grave and have marked what they believe to be the probable location.

References

Chisholm AH. (1966). "Gilbert, John (1810? – 1845)". Australian Dictionary of Biography. Volume 1. Melbourne: Melbourne University Press. pp. 441–442. Accessed 22 November 2008.
Fisher CT (1985). "Two previously unpublished letters, with the correct version of a third, from John Gilbert to John Gould". Australian Zoologist 22 (1): 5-14; back and front covers.
Fisher CT (1986). "A type specimen of the Paradise Parrot, Psephotus pulcherrimus (Gould, 1845)". Australian Zoologist 22 (3): 10-12.
Fisher CT (1988). "An unpublished drawing of the Pig-footed Bandicoot by John Gould and H.C. Richter, with comments on museum specimens". Australian Zoologist  24 (4): 205-209; plus cover plate.

Cited sources

External links 
John Gilbert:  A collector extraordinaire at the Australian Museum
Gilbert, John (1810? - 1845) in Encyclopedia of Australian Science
John Gilbert's life and collections published on the website of World Museum, National Museums Liverpool, UK
John Gilbert's diary of the Leichhardt expedition  published on the website of World Museum, National Museums Liverpool, UK

English naturalists
English explorers
Explorers of Australia
Explorers of Western Australia
English emigrants to colonial Australia
1812 births
1845 deaths